The 2018 Pan American Women's Youth Handball Championship was the 12th edition of the tournament, held in the city of Buenos Aires, Argentina at the CeNARD from 10 to 14 April 2018. It acts as the American qualifying tournament for the 2018 Women's Youth World Handball Championship.

Results

Round robin
All times are local (UTC−03:00).

Final standing

References

External links
CAH official website

Pan American Women's Youth Handball Championship
Pan American Women's Youth Handball Championship
April 2018 sports events in South America
International handball competitions hosted by Argentina
2018 in Argentine sport
 Sports competitions in Buenos Aires